The Binghamton Triplets were a minor league baseball team based in Binghamton, New York between 1923 and 1963. The franchise played as members of the New York–Penn League (1923–1937), Eastern League (1938–1963), New York–Penn League (1964–1966) and Eastern League (1967–1968). Binghamton was a minor league affiliate of the New York Yankees, Milwaukee Braves and Kansas City Athletics, winning ten league championships.

History

Binghamton was affiliated with the New York Yankees from 1932 to 1961 and 1965 to 1968; the team also had brief affiliations with the Kansas City Athletics in 1962 and 1963 and the Milwaukee Braves in 1964. The Triplets played in the former New York–Pennsylvania League from 1923 to 1937, the Eastern League from 1938 to 1963 and 1967 to 1968, and the modern New York–Penn League from 1964 to 1966. They won league championships in 1929, 1933, 1935, 1940, 1944, 1949, 1952, 1953, 1965, and 1967. The Triplets moved to Manchester, New Hampshire after the 1968 season and became the Manchester Yankees, and the city was without a team until the current Class AA Binghamton Rumble Ponies began play in 1992.

The Triplets played their home games at Johnson Field in nearby Johnson City, New York until the team disbanded in 1968; the old ballpark was then torn down to help construct New York Route 17. The team wore caps with an intertwined 'T' and 'C' logo (similar to the original Minnesota Twins cap insignia); the letters stood for 'Triple Cities' (i.e., Binghamton, Johnson City, and Endicott). While the Triplets were a Yankee farm team, the parent club—featuring such legends as Babe Ruth, Lou Gehrig, Joe DiMaggio, and Mickey Mantle—played one exhibition game each year at Johnson Field.

Notable alumni

Baseball Hall of Fame alumni
 Whitey Ford (1949) Inducted, 1974
 Lefty Gomez (1946-1947) Inducted, 1972
 Tony LaRussa (1962) Inducted, 2014

Notable alumni
 John Malangone (1955)
 Gene Bearden (1945) 1948 AL ERA Title
 Tiny Bonham (1936) 2 x MLB All-Star
 Clete Boyer (1957)
 Garland Braxton (1946) 1928 AL ERA Title
 Max Butcher (1934)
 Bert Campaneris (1962) 6 x MLB All-Star
 Spud Chandler (1932-1933) 4 x MLB All-Star; 1943 AL Most Valuable Player
 Horace Clarke (1960)
 Atley Donald (1936)
 Al Downing (1961, 1968) MLB All-Star
 Jim Finigan (1950) 2 x MLB All-Star
 Freddie Fitzsimmons (1956)
 Hank Foiles (1949) MLB All-Star
 Cito Gaston (1964) MLB All-Star; Manager: 2 x World Series Champion Toronto Blue Jays (1992-1993)
 Bob Grim (1951) MLB All-Star; 1954 AL Rookie of the Year
 Heinie Groh (1931)
Harry Gumbert (1932)
 Randy Gumpert (1940) MLB All-Star
 Pinky Hargrave (1937)
 Woodie Held (953)
 Tommy Holmes (1938) 2 x MLB All-Star
 Ralph Houk (1941) Manager: 2 x World Series Champion NY Yankees (1961-1962)
 Billy Johnson (1941) MLB All-Star
 Deron Johnson (1957)
 Bob Keegan 91946) MLB All-Star
 Ellis Kinder (1941)
 Lew Krausse (1962)
 Ted Kubiak (1962)
 Johnny Lindell (1937) MLB All-Star
 Dale Long (1950) MLB All-Star
 Mike Lum (1964)
 Jerry Lumpe (1953) MLB All-Star
 Pinky May (1934) MLB All-Star
 Clyde McCullough (1937) 2 x MLB All-Star
 John McNamara (1963) 1986 AL Manager of the Year
 George McQuinn (1932-1933) 7 x MLB All-Star
 Tom Morgan (1950)
 Thurman Munson (1968) Died Age 32; 7 x All-Star; 1970 AL Rookie of the Year; 1976 AL Most Valuable Player
 Fred Norman (1962)
 John O'Donoghue (1963) MLB All-Star
 Andy Pafko (1964) 5 x MLB All-Star
 Joe Pepitone (1960) 3 x MLB All-Star
 Mel Queen (1941)
 Vic Raschi (1946) 4 x MLB All-Star
 Ellie Rodriguez (1967) 2 x MLB All-Star
 Buddy Rosar (1934) 5 x MLB All-Star
 Ken Sanders (1962)
 Eddie Sawyer (1942-1943)
 George Selkirk (1948-1950) 2 x MLB All-Star
 Bill Skowron (1951) 8 x MLB All-Star
 Moose Solters (1932)
 Bud Souchock (1941)
 Snuffy Stirnweiss (1955) 2 x MLB All-Star; 1945 AL Batting Title
 Russ Snyder (1955)
 Pete Suder (1938)
 Ralph Terry (1954) 2 x MLB All Star; 1962 World Series Most Valuable Player
 Lee Thomas (1956, 1959) 2 x MLB All-Star
 Marv Throneberry (1953)
 Jim Tobin (1933-1934) MLB All-Star
 Tom Tresh (1959) 3 x MLB All-Star; 1962 AL Rookie of the Year
 Gus Triandos (1950) 4 x MLB All-Star
 Bill Virdon (1952) 1956 NL Rookie of the Year
 Bill Wight (1942)

Triplet players of note
 Whitey Ford: Yankee left-handed starter and member of the Baseball Hall of Fame.
 Thurman Munson: Yankee captain and all-star catcher, who played for the Triplets in their swansong 1968 season.
 Bobby Richardson: second baseman who won the 1960 World Series MVP (even though the Bronx Bombers lost the series).
 Joe Pepitone: Gold Glove-winning first baseman.
 Al Downing: On April 8, 1974, while pitching for the Los Angeles Dodgers, Downing yielded Hank Aaron's 715th home run.
 Clete Boyer: defensive standout third baseman, whose brothers (Ken and Cloyd) were also major leaguers.
 Marv Throneberry: 'Marvelous Marv' was a member of the infamous 1962 Mets.
 Ken Harrelson: longtime White Sox broadcaster, who hit 38 homers and drove in 138 runs for the Triplets in 1962, and who led the AL in RBIs in 1968 (with 109, as a member of the Red Sox).
 Vic Raschi: one the "Big Three" of the Yankees' pitching staff in the late 1940s and early 1950s.
 Tony La Russa: Baseball Hall of Fame manager who won the World Series in both leagues (with the Oakland Athletics and St. Louis Cardinals).
 Cito Gaston: manager of the Toronto Blue Jays during their two World Series victories (1992 and 1993).
 Bert Campaneris: All Star shortstop for Kansas City A's and Oakland A's, first MLB player to play all nine positions in one game September 8, 1965, led AL in steals 6 times, 1965–68, 1970 and 1972
 John McNamara: minor league catcher who went on to manage the Oakland A's, San Diego Padres, Cincinnati Reds, California Angels, Boston Red Sox, and Cleveland Indians winning AL Manager of the Year with Boston in 1986

Triplet managers of MLB note
(Listed chronologically per tenure as Triplet manager.)

 Mike Konnick: Cincinnati Reds shortstop and catcher.
 Heinie Groh: Cincinnati Reds and New York Giants third baseman famed for his 'bottle bat.'
 Billy Meyer: known for his woes as Pittsburgh Pirates manager.
 Lefty Gomez: Yankee Hall-of-Fame southpaw hurler.
 George ‘Twinkletoes’ Selkirk: replaced Babe Ruth as starting Yankee right fielder.
 George ‘Snuffy’ Stirnweiss: slick-fielding Yankee second baseman.
 Freddie Fitzsimmons: New York Giants and Brooklyn Dodgers knuckleballer.
 Granny Hamner: shortstop for the 1950 Phillies 'Whiz Kids'.
 John McNamara: manager of the AL-pennant-winning 1986 Boston Red Sox.
 Andy Pafko: outfielder for the 1957 World Series champion Braves.
 Cloyd Boyer: St. Louis Cardinal pitcher, and brother of Clete and Ken.

References

Baseball in Broome County (2004). by Marvin Cohen and Michael McCann.

 
Defunct baseball teams in New York (state)
Defunct Eastern League (1938–present) teams
Defunct New York–Penn League teams
New York Yankees minor league affiliates
Kansas City Athletics minor league affiliates
Milwaukee Braves minor league affiliates
Baseball teams established in 1923
Baseball teams disestablished in 1968
1923 establishments in New York (state)
1968 disestablishments in New York (state)
Baseball in Binghamton, New York